Grouard is a hamlet in Alberta, Canada. 

Grouard may also refer to:

People
Benjamin Franklin Grouard (1819–1894), Latter Day Saint missionary to the Society Islands
Émile Grouard (1840–1931), French Roman Catholic priest
Frank Grouard (1850–1905), U.S. Army scout in the American Indian War
Serge Grouard (born 1959), member of the National Assembly of France

Other uses
Grouard (electoral district), a provincial electoral district in Alberta, Canada